The device mapper is a framework provided by the Linux kernel for mapping physical block devices onto higher-level virtual block devices.  It forms the foundation of the logical volume manager (LVM), software RAIDs and dm-crypt disk encryption, and offers additional features such as file system snapshots.

Device mapper works by passing data from a virtual block device, which is provided by the device mapper itself, to another block device.  Data can be also modified in transition, which is performed, for example, in the case of device mapper providing disk encryption or simulation of unreliable hardware behavior.

This article focuses on the device mapper implementation in the Linux kernel, but the device mapper functionality is also available in both NetBSD and DragonFly BSD.

Usage 
Applications (like LVM2 and Enterprise Volume Management System (EVMS)) that need to create new mapped devices talk to the device mapper via the libdevmapper.so shared library, which in turn issues ioctls to the /dev/mapper/control device node.  Configuration of the device mapper can be also examined and configured interactivelyor from shell scriptsby using the  utility.

Both of these two userspace components have their source code maintained alongside the LVM2 source.

Features 

Functions provided by the device mapper include linear, striped and error mappings, as well as crypt and multipath targets.  For example, two disks may be concatenated into one logical volume with a pair of linear mappings, one for each disk.  As another example, crypt target encrypts the data passing through the specified device, by using the Linux kernel's Crypto API.

, the following mapping targets are available:

 cache allows creation of hybrid volumes, by using solid-state drives (SSDs) as caches for hard disk drives (HDDs)
 clone will permit usage before a transfer is complete.
 crypt provides data encryption, by using the Linux kernel's Crypto API
 delay delays reads and/or writes to different devices (used for testing)
 era behaves in a way similar to the linear target, while it keeps track of blocks that were written to within a user-defined period of time
 error simulates I/O errors for all mapped blocks (used for testing)
 flakey simulates periodic unreliable behaviour (used for testing)
 linear maps a continuous range of blocks onto another block device
 mirror maps a mirrored logical device, while providing data redundancy
 multipath supports the mapping of multipathed devices, through usage of their path groups
 raid offers an interface to the Linux kernel's software RAID driver (md)
 snapshot and snapshot-origin used for creation of LVM snapshots, as part of the underlying copy-on-write scheme
 striped stripes the data across physical devices, with the number of stripes and the striping chunk size as parameters
 thin  allows creation of devices larger than the underlying physical device, physical space is allocated only when written to
 zero an equivalent of /dev/zero, all reads return blocks of zeros, and writes are discarded

Applications 
Linux kernel features and projects built on top of the device mapper include the following:

 cryptsetup utility used to conveniently setup disk encryption based on dm-crypt
 dm-crypt/LUKS mapping target that provides volume encryption
 dm-cache mapping target that allows creation of hybrid volumes
 dm-integrity mapping target that provides data integrity, either using checksumming or cryptographic verification, also used with LUKS
 dm-log-writes mapping target that uses two devices, passing through the first device and logging the write operations performed to it on the second device
 dm-verity validates the data blocks contained in a file system against a list of cryptographic hash values, developed as part of the ChromiumOS project
  provides access to "fake" RAID configurations via the device mapper
 DM Multipath provides I/O failover and load-balancing of block devices within the Linux kernel
 Docker uses device mapper to create copy-on-write storage for software containers
 DRBD (Distributed Replicated Block Device)
 EVMS (deprecated)
  utility called from hotplug upon device maps creation and deletion
 LVM2 logical volume manager for the Linux kernel
 VeraCrypt - Linux version of TrueCrypt
VDO - Virtual Data Optimizer

References

External links 
 Device mapper home at Red Hat
  an article illustrating the use of various device mapper targets
 userspace tool to set up software RAID using various RAID metadata formats
 Multipath support in the device mapper, LWN.net, February 23, 2005, by Jonathan Corbet

 
Red Hat software